Atractomorpha is a genus in the Sphaeropleaceae, a family of green algae.
The genus name is derived from the Greek and means something like "spindle-shaped" or "arrow-shaped". This apparently refers to the shape of the cells.

References

External links

Sphaeropleales genera
Sphaeropleales